Events in the year 1937 in Belgium.

Incumbents
Monarch – Leopold III (from 17 February)
Prime Minister – Paul van Zeeland (to 24 November); Paul-Émile Janson (from 24 November)

Events
 22 to 25 May – King Baudouin makes a state visit to Britain.
 20 June – 25th Gordon Bennett Cup held in Brussels.

Publications
 Hergé, L'Oreille cassée (serialised December 1935 to February 1937)
 Henri Pirenne, Mahomet et Charlemagne (posthumous)
 H. E. Reed, Hogs in Belgian Agriculture (Washington D.C., United States Department of Agriculture Bureau of Agricultural Economics)

Art and architecture

Buildings
 Raymond Lemaire, Institute of Agriculture, Heverlee

Paintings
 René Magritte, La Reproduction Interdite

Births
 1 January – Willy Kuijpers, politician (died 2020)
 3 November – Gaspard Hons, poet (died 2020)

Deaths
 8 November – Joseph Mansion (born 1877), philologist

References

 
1930s in Belgium
Belgium
Years of the 20th century in Belgium
Belgium